Edmundo Castelo Branco (born 15 March 1900, date of death unknown) was a Brazilian rower. He competed in the men's double sculls event at the 1924 Summer Olympics.

References

External links
 

1900 births
Year of death missing
Brazilian male rowers
Olympic rowers of Brazil
Rowers at the 1924 Summer Olympics
Rowers from Rio de Janeiro (city)